Skyforest is an unincorporated community in San Bernardino County, California, United States.

Skyforest has a post office with ZIP code 92385, which opened in 1928.

Ecosystem and natural characteristics 
Skyforest is situated on a mile-high ridge surrounded by forest of fir, cedar, pine and oak.

According to the Köppen Climate Classification system, Skyforest has a warm-summer Mediterranean climate, abbreviated "Csa" on climate maps.

History and development 
Skyforest has long been used for recreation. The history of Skyforest is interwoven with that of the San Bernardino Mountains, a summer hunting ground for indigenous people for thousands of years. Prior to the founding of the local USPS in 1928, residents referred to their community as Forest of The Sky.

The Plott, Kuffel and Henck families were among the first to homestead Skyforest, which grew with the logging industry of the 20th century.

Skyforest today includes three neighborhoods and a small commercial district.

Commerce 
As of 2019, there are more than a dozen businesses located in Skyforest.

Businesses in Skyforest include Skypark Bike ParK (Skypark at Santa's Village), Lou Eddie's Pizzeria, Rosalva's Mexican Restaurant, The Sky View Inn, At The Cabin, Skyforest Yoga Playscape, Belle's Antiques, Torres Boutique, and other small retailers. Also located in Skyforest are Rim Family Services, St. Richard's Church, Skyforest Mutual Water Co. and other commercial/residential buildings.

Demographic information 
Skyforest is inhabited by humans as well as old world trees, and a diversity of plant and animal wildlife.

Among the human population, there are both full-time and part-time, often living in family units. The permanent population of Skyforest, like the Mountains Community at large, is growing.

Those identifying with Skyforest as their Primary Residence are constituents of CA State Assembly District 33 and State Senate District 23. As an unincorporated community, residents rely on County Officials for representation and public administration as well.

Environmental data

References

Unincorporated communities in San Bernardino County, California
Unincorporated communities in California